Bussière-Boffy is a former commune in the Haute-Vienne department in western France. On 1 January 2016, it was merged with Mezieres sur Issoire into the new commune Val-d'Issoire.

The "Place de l'Eglise" (formerly "Le Bourg"), is now known as "Place Notre Dame". Mezieres sur Issoire retains it's "Place de l'Eglise". 

Inhabitants are known as Bussiérands.

2022 Presidential Election: the mayor Jean-Paul BARRIERE has sponsored far right candidate Eric ZEMMOUR. The mayor of Val d'Issoire (Pascal GODRIE), has yet to declare any sponsorship as of 11/02/2022.

See also
Communes of the Haute-Vienne department

References

Former communes of Haute-Vienne